Triangle Studios is a mid-sized computer game development company based in Leeuwarden, Netherlands, founded in 2005. It has developed several games for the PC, the Nintendo DS and iOS. On March 2, 2010, the company opened a new branch office in Dallas, Texas. They participated in the Tokyo Game Show in 2008 as a part of the Holland Pavilion, in order to establish connections with Japanese publishers and enter the Asian gaming market.

Games 

Triangle Studios initial focus was the development of games for the Nintendo DS:

 Stratego: Next Edition
 K3 en het IJsprinsesje
 Plop en de Penguïn
 Eén tegen 100
 10 voor Taal
 Pluk van de Petteflet
 Denksport Varia
 Winter's Tail
 Think Kids 2
 My Virtual Tutor: Pre-K to Kindergarten
 My Virtual Tutor: Kindergarten to First Grade
 My Virtual Tutor: First Grade to Second Grade
 Suske en Wiske: De Texas Rakkers
 Calvin Tucker's Redneck Racing

Triangle Studios developed a game about the historical figure Pier Gerlofs Donia titled Cross of the Dutchman.The game received "mixed or average reviews" per Metacritic, with an average score of 59 out of 100. Together with 'It came from space and ate our brains' this makes up Triangle Studios original IP's. In June 2011, Triangle Studios released the "Visit McKinney Texas" app at the behest of the McKinney Convention & Visitors Bureau, which "provides information and links to city restaurants, hotels, attractions, and the city's social media feeds".

Awards
 2009 Young Entrepreneur Award

References

External links
 Triangle Studios Official Site

Video game companies established in 2005
Video game development companies
Video game companies of the Netherlands
Dutch companies established in 2005
Companies based in Friesland